Nikolaus Joseph Freiherr von Jacquin (16 February 172726 October 1817) was a scientist who studied medicine, chemistry and botany.

Biography

Born in Leiden in the Netherlands, he studied medicine at Leiden University, then moved first to Paris and afterward to Vienna. In 1752, he studied under Gerard van Swieten in Vienna.

Between 1755 and 1759, Jacquin was sent to the West Indies, Central America, Venezuela and New Granada by Francis I to collect plants for the Schönbrunn Palace, and amassed a large collection of animal, plant and mineral samples. In 1797, Alexander von Humboldt profited from studying these collections and conversing with Jacquin in preparation of his own journey to the Americas.

In 1763, Jacquin became professor of chemistry and mineralogy at the Bergakademie Schemnitz (now Banská Štiavnica in Slovakia). In 1768, he was appointed Professor of Botany and Chemistry and became director of the botanical gardens of the University of Vienna. For his work, he received the title Edler in 1774. In 1783, he was elected a foreign member of the Royal Swedish Academy of Sciences. In 1806, he was created a baron. In 1809, he became a correspondent of the Royal Institute, which later became the Royal Netherlands Academy of Arts and Sciences.

His younger son, Emil Gottfried (1767–1792), and his daughter, Franziska (1769–1850), were friends of Mozart; Mozart wrote two songs for Gottfried to publish under Gottfried's name ("Als Luise ...", K. 520, and "Das Traumbild", K. 530) and gave piano lessons to Franziska. Mozart dedicated a considerable number of his works to the Jacquin family, notably the Kegelstatt Trio. This was first played at the Jacquins' house in August 1786 with Franziska playing the piano.

His son Joseph Franz (1766–1839) succeeded him as professor of botany and chemistry at the University of Vienna and wrote several notable botanical books.

Von Jacquin died in Vienna.

He is commemorated by the genera Jacquinia (Theophrastaceae) and Jacquiniella (Orchidaceae). In 2011, the Austrian Mint issued silver coins to mark his science expeditions to the Caribbean.

Publications
Enumeratio systematica plantarum (1760)
Enumeratio Stirpium Plerarumque (1762)
Selectarum Stirpium Americanarum (1763)
Observationum Botanicarum (part 1 1764, part 2 1767, part 3 1768, part 4 1771)
Hortus Botanicus Vindobonensis (3 volumes, 1770–1776) with plates by Franz Anton von Scheidel
Florae Austriacae (5 volumes, 1773–1778)
Icones Plantarum Rariorum (3 volumes, 1781–1793)
Plantarum Rariorum Horti Caesarei Schoenbrunnensis (4 volumes, 1797–1804)
Fragmenta Botanica 1804–1809 (1809)
Nicolai Josephi Jacquin collectaneorum supplementum ...
Oxalis :Monographia iconibus illustrata
Dreyhundert auserlesene amerikanische Gewächse nach linneischer Ordnung (with Zorn, Johannes)
 Nikolaus Joseph Edlen von Jacquin's Anfangsgründe der medicinisch-practischen Chymie : zum Gebrauche seiner Vorlesungen . Wappler, Vienna 1783 Digital edition by the University and State Library Düsseldorf
 Nikolaus Joseph Edlen von Jacquin's Anfangsgründe der medicinisch-practischen Chymie : zum Gebrauche seiner Vorlesungen . Wappler, Vienna, 2nd. ed. 1785 Digital edition by the University and State Library Düsseldorf

Notes

External links
 

1727 births
1817 deaths
People from Leiden
18th-century Austrian botanists
Austrian explorers
Austrian mycologists
Austrian ornithologists
Barons of Austria
Botanists active in North America
Botanists active in the Caribbean
Bryologists
Dutch bryologists
18th-century Dutch botanists
18th-century Dutch chemists
Dutch mycologists
18th-century Dutch naturalists
Fellows of the Royal Society
Honorary members of the Saint Petersburg Academy of Sciences
Members of the Royal Netherlands Academy of Arts and Sciences
Members of the Royal Swedish Academy of Sciences
Phycologists
Pteridologists